Tam Ping-man (14 November 1933 – 5 September 2020) was a Hong Kong actor and singer. With his deep-rooted dubbing work and nurturing talents, he has been full of talents for half a century and has earned him the reputation of "dubbing king". Some of his most famous dubbing work includes being the voice of the U.S. actor Marlon Brando in the movie The Godfather (1972) and Charlie Townsend in the U.S. TV series Charlie's Angels (1976 to 1981). In addition, he was the first horse racing commentator in Hong Kong.

Besides dubbing work, Tam was an avid actor, he has recurring appearances in the popular variety show Enjoy Yourself Tonight or EYT, he had also starred in many well-known TVB TV series such as A House Is Not a Home (TV series), Yesterday's Glitter, The Shell Game, The Misadventure of Zoo etc.

Tam had a long-time on-screen partner who was also a well known Hong Kong actress, Lee Heung-kam. They co-founded a production company together in 1974.

Tam received the TVB Anniversary Awards - Life Achievement Award in 2014.

On September 5, 2020, Tam died at Ruttonjee Hospital in Wan Chai at the age of 86, he had cancer and was having difficulty breathing before being rushed to the hospital.

References

External links

1933 births
2020 deaths
20th-century Hong Kong male actors
21st-century Hong Kong male actors
Hong Kong Buddhists
Hong Kong male film actors
Hong Kong male singers
Hong Kong male television actors
Hong Kong male voice actors